Jørgen Thorup (born 7 May 1950) is a Danish fencer. He competed in the team épée event at the 1972 Summer Olympics.

References

1950 births
Living people
Danish male épée fencers
Olympic fencers of Denmark
Fencers at the 1972 Summer Olympics
Sportspeople from Copenhagen